Kayyali (also spelled Al-Kayyali, El-Kayyali, Al-Kayali, El-Kayali, Kayali, or Kayalı, or ) is an Arabic and Turkish family name.

 Abdülkadir Kayalı (born 1991), Turkish footballer
 Abd al-Rahman al-Kayyali (1887–1969), former Syrian Minister of Justice
 Louay Kayyali (1934–1978), Syrian modern artist

Arabic-language surnames
Turkish-language surnames